Union 38 is a school district that serves Franklin County, Massachusetts. It operates 5 schools, 4 of which are elementary schools, and one regional high school.

About 
Frontier Regional and Union 38 School District are located in rural Western Massachusetts. Approximately 1,700 students are enrolled PreK-12. The district employs approximately 180 certified personnel and a support staff of about 140 (including our Before and After School Programs, Daybreak, Full-Day Preschool and Frontier Extension Programs). Occupying four new buildings, the Union #38 School District (PreK-6) serves the towns of Conway, Deerfield, Sunderland and Whately. Each town is governed by a local school committee. The Frontier Regional School District (grades 7–12) completed its building project in September 1998 and is governed by a separate nine member school committee.  Approximately 85% of the graduates pursue a two-year or four year post secondary education.

Schools 
 Frontier Regional School
 Deerfield Elementary School (DES)
 Conway Grammar School
 Sunderland Elementary School
 Whately Elementary School

References

External links 

Frontier Regional School
Union 38 District

Education in Franklin County, Massachusetts  

School districts in Massachusetts